Lake Sarasota is a census-designated place (CDP) in Sarasota County, Florida, United States. The population was 4,679 at the 2010 census. It is part of the North Port–Sarasota–Bradenton Metropolitan Statistical Area.

Geography

Demographics

As of the census of 2010, there were 4,679 people, 1,703 households, and 1,301 families residing in the CDP. The racial makeup of the CDP was 92.74% White, 2.48% African American, 0.17% Native American, 1.20% Asian, 0.19% Pacific Islander, 1.85% from other races, and 1.37% from two or more races. Hispanic or Latino of any race were 8.63% of the population.

There were 1,703 households, of which 76.4% were family households, and 23.6% were non-family households. Of the 1,301 family households, 46.2% had children under the age of 18 living with them. 72.5% of families contained a married couple living together, 8.6% had a male householder with no wife present, and 18.9% had a female householder with no husband present. Of the 402 non-family households, 73.4% were one-person households. 17.3% of all households were made up of individuals and 5.6% of all households had someone living alone who was 65 years of age or older.  The average household size was 2.75 and the average family size was 3.08.

In the CDP, the population was spread out, with 24.9% under the age of 18, 8.4% from 18 to 24, 26.2% from 25 to 44, 30.9% from 45 to 64, and 9.6% who were 65 years of age or older.  The median age was 38.3 years. The population was 49.5% male and 50.5% female.

The 2010 Decennial Census did not report income data. The 2020 American Community Survey: 5-Yr Estimates Tables show the median income for a household in the CDP was $84,112, and the median income for a family was $89,276. Males had a median income of $47,122 versus $26,233 for females. About 4.90% of families and 5.67% of the population were below the poverty line, including 2.77% of those under age 18 and 6.77% of those age 65 or over. 85.1% of individuals below the poverty line were female.

References

External links
Lake Sarasota Community Blog

Census-designated places in Sarasota County, Florida
Sarasota metropolitan area
Census-designated places in Florida